Jayshree may refer to:
 Jayshree Arora, Indian actress, dancer
 Jayshree Gadkar, Indian Marathi and Hindi film actress
 Jayshree Khadilkar, Indian chess player
 Jayshree Soni, Indiana actress
 Jayshree T., Indian Marathi actress and dancer
 Jayshree Talwalkar, Indian philosopher, spiritual leader, social reformer
 Jayshree Ullal, American businesswoman